The Oregon State Beavers men's basketball program, established in 1901, is the intercollegiate men's basketball program of Oregon State University in Corvallis, Oregon. Members of the Pac-12 Conference in NCAA Division I, the team plays home games on campus at Gill Coliseum, and the current head coach is Wayne Tinkle.

Oregon State has won 14 conference championships and appeared in the NCAA tournament 18 times (three 
(1980–82) were later vacated by the NCAA). The Beavers have advanced to the Final Four twice (1949, 1963), and their most recent tournament appearance was in 2021, when they advanced to the Elite Eight after winning their first tournament games since 1982.

Conferences

^ Pac-12's previous names: AAWU (1959–1968), Pacific-8 (1968–1978), and Pacific-10 (1978–2011)

Coaches
The Oregon State men's basketball team has had 21 head coaches, with one interim (2008). Both Amory T. "Slats" Gill and Ralph Miller are members of the Naismith Memorial Basketball Hall of Fame. Craig Robinson, the coach preceding Wayne Tinkle, was hired by OSU in 2008 out of Brown University, where he had just coached the Bears to a school-record 19 wins. Robinson is the brother of United States first lady Michelle Obama, and the brother-in-law to United States President Barack Obama. The longest-tenured head coach was Slats Gill, who was the coach for 36 seasons, winning 599 games during his time at OSU. The current coach, Wayne Tinkle, was hired by OSU in 2014 from the University of Montana – Missoula, where he coached the Montana Grizzlies to two Big Sky Conference championships and a school-record 25 wins.

History

1980–83 – Orange Express

The 1980–81 Oregon State men's basketball season was arguably one of the best yet most upsetting basketball seasons in Oregon State history. The team was referred to as the Orange Express and was led by Beaver legendary coach Ralph Miller. The Orange Express season was led by Beaver great, Steve Johnson, in his last year at OSU, and the Beavers were second in the final polls, released prior to the NCAA tournament. This was the first time in OSU history that the Beavers won at UCLA, and the Orange Express spent a school record eight weeks ranked first in at least one of the AP and Coaches Polls. They had a bye in the first round, but were upset in their opening game by #8 seed Kansas State 50–48 in the second round, at Pauley Pavilion in Los Angeles. Miller was awarded UPI and AP Coach of the Year honors and Steve Johnson received All-American honors.

The Beavers' record included a  home record at Gill Coliseum, including a school best 24 consecutive home wins.

However, NCAA sanctions followed these standout teams. The NCAA found that many players, from 1979 to 1983 were involved in improper arrangements with outside representative related to the purchase of complimentary basketball tickets and the receipt of other prohibited benefits. The NCAA vacated appearances from the 1980, 1981, and 1982 tournaments.

Postseason

NCAA tournament results
The Beavers have appeared in the NCAA tournament 18 times. Their combined record is 15–21. OSU had three NCAA Tournament appearances (1980, 1981 and 1982) vacated by the NCAA, resulting in 15 recognized appearances and an "official" NCAA Tournament record of 13–18. Their former 46-year drought between wins was the longest drought of any team from a major conference. 

* Appearances and results from 1980, 1981, and 1982 were later vacated by the NCAA.

NIT results
The Beavers have appeared in the National Invitation Tournament (NIT) four times, with a combined record of 3–4.

CBI results
The Beavers have appeared in the College Basketball Invitational (CBI) four times.Their combined record is 7–4, and they were the champions in 2009.

All-time record vs. Pac-12 opponents

 Note all-time series includes non-conference matchups.

Rivalries
Oregon Ducks — Oregon State's main rivalry (formerly known as the Civil War) is with the Ducks.

Washington Huskies — The Dog Fight is one of Oregon State's lesser known rivalry games.

Washington State Cougars — As land-grant universities, WSU and OSU have a longtime regional rivalry.

Arizona Wildcats – The Cat's Meow was coined during the Ralph Miller era when the Beavers would match-up against famed-coach Lute Olson's squad.

Notable players
Oregon State has had 75 all-conference and 32 All-America selections, five Pac-10 Players of the Year, 42 players selected in the NBA draft, and 24 players that have gone on to play in the NBA. Additionally, OSU basketball alumni have 4 gold medals at the Olympics, including one by Lew Beck, who never played in the NBA. A total of 7 players have won 11 NBA titles, including three by A. C. Green, two by Brent Barry, two by Mel Counts, and one each by Red Rocha, Dave Gambee, Lonnie Shelton, and Gary Payton.

NBA players

 Brent Barry
 Vic Bartolome
 Corey Benjamin
 Ricky Berry
 Ray Blume
 Freddie Boyd
 Jay Carty
 Lester Conner
 Mel Counts
 Jared Cunningham
 Drew Eubanks
 Gary Freeman
 Dave Gambee
 A. C. Green
 Swede Halbrook
 Scott Haskin
 Jim Jarvis
 Omari Johnson
 Steve Johnson
 John Mandic
 Eric Moreland
 José Ortiz
 Gary Payton
 Gary Payton II
 Loy Petersen
 Mark Radford
 Red Rocha
 Lonnie Shelton
 Charlie Sitton
 Ethan Thompson

International league players

 Stephen Thompson Jr. (born 1997), basketball player in the Israeli Basketball Premier League

Retired numbers

Oregon State has retired the jersey numbers of five players:

NCAA records
The individual and team NCAA records below are current as of the end of the 2015–16 season.

Individual Records
 Field Goal Percentage (Single season)
 1st – 74.6% — Steve Johnson, 1981 (235 of 315)
 5th – 71.0% — Steve Johnson, 1980 (211 of 297)
 Field Goal Percentage (Career, min. 400 made and 4 made per game)
 1st – 67.8% — Steve Johnson, 1976–81 (828 of 1,222)
 Field Goal Percentage (Single game, min. 12 field goals made)
 1st (tie) – 100% Steve Johnson vs. Hawaii-Hilo (13 of 13), Dec. 5, 1979
 Field Goal Percentage – Senior
 1st – 74.6% — Steve Johnson, 1981 (235 of 315)
 Field Goal Percentage – Junior
 1st – 71.0% — Steve Johnson, 1980 (211 of 297)
 Total Rebounds (Single game)
 16th (tie) – 36 – Swede Halbrook vs. Idaho, Feb. 15, 1955
 Assists (Career)
 12th – 939 – Gary Payton, 1987–1990
 Average Assists Per Game (Career, min. 550 assists)
 9th – 7.82 – Gary Payton, 1987–1990
 Steals (Career)
 25th (tie) – 321 – Gary Payton, 1987–1990
Team Records
 Free-Throw Percentage (Single game, min. 30 free throws made)
 16th (tie) – 30–31 vs. Memphis, Dec. 19, 1990
 Steals (Single game)
 22nd (tie) – 27 vs. Hawaii-Loa, Dec. 22, 1985
 Field Goal Percentage (Season)
 3rd – 56.4% – 1981
 26th – 54.4% – 1980
 All-Time Victories (Min. 25 years in Division I)
 23rd – 1,763 wins
 Games played vs. Single Opponent
 1st – 354 vs. Oregon
 3rd – 305 vs. Washington
 4th – 303 vs. Washington State
 Victories vs. Single Opponent
 T-2nd – 190 vs. Oregon
 6th – 174 vs. Washington State

References

External links
 

 
1901 establishments in Oregon